The Canadian federal budget for fiscal year 1983-1984 was presented by Minister of Finance Marc Lalonde in the House of Commons of Canada on 19 April 1983.

External links 

 Budget Speech
 Budget Papers
 Budget in Brief

References

Canadian budgets
1983 in Canadian law
1983 government budgets
1983 in Canadian politics